Tectonites are metamorphic or tectonically deformed rocks whose fabric reflects the history of their deformation, or rocks with fabric that clearly displays coordinated geometric features that indicate continuous solid (ductile) flow during formation. Planar foliation results from a parallel orientation of platey mineral phases such as the phyllosilicates or graphite. Slender prismatic crystals such as amphibole produce a lineation in which these prisms or columnar crystals become aligned.
Tectonites are rocks with minerals that have been affected by natural forces of the earth, which allowed their orientations to change. This usually includes recrystallization of minerals, and the foliation formation. Tectonites are studied through structural analysis and allows for the determination of two things:
The orientation of shearing and compressive stresses during (dynamic) metamorphism
The later (or final) stages of metamorphism

According to the nature of mineral orientation, there are three main groups of tectonites, L-Tectonites, S-Tectonites, and LS-Tectonites. The different types reflect on the different ways that matter moves.
L-Tectonites are aligned in a linear fabric, which allows the rock to split into rod-like shapes due to the two intersecting planes. The foliation of this type is not strong.
S-Tectonites are the fabric that is dominantly a foliation fabric which allows the rock to split into plate-like sheets that are parallel to foliation. There are little to no linear fabrics within the foliation fabrics.
LS-Tectonites is the perfect mix of the two, with both strong lineations and strong foliations. This is caused by the rotation of the grains around axes that are oriented along the trends of the folds.

Classification
S-tectonites (from the German, Schiefer for schist) have a dominant planar fabric and may indicate a flattening type of strain. This may also be due to a lack of minerals capable of giving a lineation e.g. in a phyllonite.
L-tectonites have a dominant linear fabric and generally indicate a constrictional type of strain. This may be due to a lack of platey phases.
L-S tectonites have equally developed linear and planar fabric elements and may indicate a plane strain deformation. Many mylonites are L-S tectonites consistent with a simple shear deformation.
L-Tectonites (Lineations) indicate Constrictional Strain
S-Tectonites (Foliations) indicate Flattening Strain
L-S Tectonites (Plain strain) indicate both elongation and flattening strain

References

Structural geology
Metamorphic rocks